An ESPY Award (short for Excellence in Sports Performance Yearly Award) is an accolade currently presented by the American broadcast television network ABC, and previously ESPN (as of the 2017 ESPY Awards the latter still airs them in the form of replays), to recognize individual and team athletic achievement and other sports-related performance during the calendar year preceding a given annual ceremony. The first ESPYs were awarded in 1993. Because of the ceremony's rescheduling prior to the 2002 iteration thereof, awards presented in 2002 were for achievement and performances during the seventeen-plus previous months. As the similarly styled Grammy (for music), Emmy (for television), Academy Award (for film), and Tony (for theater), the ESPYs are hosted by a contemporary celebrity; the style, though, is lighter, more relaxed and self-referential than many other awards shows, with comedic sketches usually included.

From the show's inception to 2004, ESPY Award winners were chosen only through voting by fans. Since 2004, sportswriters, broadcasters, sports executives, and sportspersons, collectively experts; or ESPN personalities also vote.  Award winners have been selected thereafter exclusively through global online fan balloting conducted from amongst candidates selected by the ESPY Select Nominating Committee.

Charitable role
A portion of the proceeds from sales of tickets to the event devolves on the V Foundation, a charity established by collegiate basketball coach and television commentator Jim Valvano to promote cancer research.  Valvano announced the creation of the charitable foundation during his acceptance of the Arthur Ashe Courage Award during the inaugural ESPY telecast on March 3, 1993, fifty-five days before Valvano's death from metastatic adenocarcinoma.

Design
The ESPY Award statuette was designed and created by sculptor Lawrence Nowlan.

Ceremonies

Timing
Between 1993 and 2001, the ceremony was held each year in either February or March and was broadcast recorded on ESPN.

Between 2002 and 2019, the ceremony was conducted on the Wednesday in July following the Major League Baseball (MLB) All-Star Game; as it marks the only day of the year that none of the major North American professional leagues or college sports programs have games scheduled for that day—the National Basketball Association, National Football League, and National Hockey League are not in-season (though the NBA does have its post-draft training camp NBA Summer League going on and NFL teams are getting ready for training camp), colleges are in recess for the summer, and MLB does not contest games on the day following its all-star game—major sports figures (except for cycling, which has the Tour de France, minor league baseball, and golf, where The Open Championship usually starts that evening)- are available to attend. The show aired on the subsequent Sunday four days later, although the results were reported publicly by ESPN.com.

In 2010, the ceremony was aired live by ESPN for the first time since 2003. In 2015, the ESPY Awards moved to network television, airing on ESPN's corporate sister network ABC.

Location
The first seven editions of the ESPYs were held in New York City—in 1993 and 1994 at Madison Square Garden and from 1995 through 1999, at Radio City Music Hall.  The awards relocated to Las Vegas, Nevada, for two years beginning in 2000, and ultimately settled at the Dolby Theatre in Hollywood, California.  In 2006, it was announced that the awards would move in 2008 to the Microsoft Theater (formerly the Nokia Theatre), to be situated as the West Coast headquarters of ESPN at LA Live, adjacent to the Crypto.com Arena in Los Angeles, California.

Hosts
The ceremonies have been hosted variously by comedians, television and film actors, and sportspeople.  American film actor Samuel L. Jackson is the only individual to have hosted four times (in 1999, 2001, 2002, and 2009). Comedian Dennis Miller, actor and singer Jamie Foxx, and talk show host and comedian Seth Meyers are the only others to have hosted the show more than once.

Year-by-year

Awards
American professional golfer Tiger Woods is the most-honored ESPY recipient, having received 21 awards.

Extant

Cross-cutter categories
Cross-cutter awards are those for which the eligibility is not confined to those sportspersons participating in, or those events occurring in, any single or specific sport.
 Arthur Ashe Courage Award, presented to the sports-related person(s) or team, irrespective of gender or sport contested, adjudged to have made the most significant or compelling humanitarian contribution in transcendence of sports in a given year (presented since 1993)
 Best Female Athlete ESPY Award, presented to the female sportsperson, irrespective of nationality or sport contested, adjudged to be the most outstanding over a given year (1993)
 Best Male Athlete ESPY Award, presented to the male sportsperson, irrespective of nationality or sport contested, adjudged to be the most outstanding in a given year (1993)
 Best International Athlete ESPY Award, presented since 2006 to the professional sportsperson, irrespective of gender, born outside the United States adjudged to be the best in a given year 
 Best Breakthrough Athlete ESPY Award, presented to the sportsperson, irrespective of gender or sport contested, adjudged to have made the best or most significant breakthrough in his or her sport in a given year (1993)
 Best Championship Performance ESPY Award, presented to the sportsperson, irrespective of gender, nationality, or sport contested, adjudged to have made the best or most significant performance in a championship match, series, or tournament in his or her sport
 Best Coach/Manager ESPY Award, presented to the coach or manager, irrespective of nationality or sport contested, adjudged to be the most outstanding in a given year (1993)
 ESPY Award for Best College Athlete, Men's Sports, presented to the male sportsperson, irrespective of sport played, adjudged to be the best in the National Collegiate Athletic Association, in a given year (2002)
 ESPY Award for Best College Athlete, Women's Sports, presented to the female sportsperson, irrespective of sport played, adjudged to be the best in the National Collegiate Athletic Association in a given year (2002)
 Best Comeback Athlete ESPY Award, presented to the sportsperson, irrespective of gender or sport contested, adjudged to have made the most significant or impressive comeback from illness, injury, hardship, retirement, or loss of form (1993)
 Best Female Athlete with a Disability ESPY Award, presented to the female sportsperson with a disability, irrespective of nationality or sport contested, adjudged to be the best in a given year (2005)
 Best Male Athlete with a Disability ESPY Award, presented to the male sportsperson with a disability, irrespective of nationality or sport contested, adjudged to be the best in a given year (2005)
 Best Game ESPY Award, presented to the single game in a North American professional or collegiate league, irrespective of sport, adjudged to be the best in a given year (2002)
 Best Upset ESPY Award, presented to the sportsperson or team, irrespective of gender or sport contested, adjudged to have completed the best, most impressive, or most significant upset in a given year (2004)
 Best Moment ESPY Award, presented to the moment or series of moments occurring in a sporting event or season, irrespective of sport contested or gender of participating sportsperson(s), adjudged to the most remarkable, compelling, or entertaining in a given year (2002)
 Best Play ESPY Award, presented to the single play or performance, irrespective of sport contested or gender of participating sportsperson, adjudged to be the most remarkable, significant, or impressive in a given year (2002)
 Best Record-Breaking Performance ESPY Award, presented to the record-breaking single-play, game or season performance, irrespective of sport contested or gender of participating sportsperson, adjudged to be the most remarkable, significant, or impressive in a given year (2001)

 Jimmy V ESPY Award for Perseverance (2007)
 Muhammad Ali Sports Humanitarian Award, presented to "an athlete whose continuous, demonstrated leadership has created a measured positive impact on their community through sports" (2015)
 Outstanding Team ESPY Award, presented to the collegiate, professional, or national team, irrespective of sport contested, adjudged to be the most outstanding in a given year (1993)

Individual categories
Individual awards are those for which eligibility is limited to those partaking of a single individual or team sport or specific sport category.
 Best Female Action Sports Athlete ESPY Award, presented to the female action sportsperson, irrespective of nationality or discipline contested, adjudged to be the best in a given year (presented since 2004)
 Best Male Action Sports Athlete ESPY Award, presented to the male action sportsperson, irrespective of nationality or discipline contested, adjudged to be the best in a given year (2004)
 Best Angler ESPY Award, presented to the angler, irrespective of gender, adjudged to be the best in a given year (2006)
 Best Bowler ESPY Award, presented to the ten-pin bowler, irrespective of gender, adjudged to be the best playing in the United States in a given year (1995)
 Best Boxer ESPY Award, presented to the boxer, irrespective of nationality or weight class, adjudged to be the best in a given year (1993–2006 inclusive, 2019—present)
 Best Driver ESPY Award, presented to the motorsports driver, irrespective of nationality, gender, or series or sort contested adjudged to be best in a given year (1993)
 Best Female Golfer ESPY Award, presented to the female professional golfer, irrespective of nationality, adjudged to be the best in a given year (1993—2004 inclusive, 2009–present)
 Best Male Golfer ESPY Award, presented to the male professional golfer, irrespective of nationality, adjudged to be the best in a given year (1993—2004 inclusive, 2009–present)
 Best Jockey ESPY Award, presented to the thoroughbred horse racing jockey, irrespective of nationality or gender, adjudged to be the best riding in the United States in a given year (1994)
 Best MLS Player ESPY Award, presented to the player adjudged to be the best in Major League Soccer in a given year (2006)
 Best Major League Baseball Player ESPY Award, presented to the player adjudged to be the best in Major League Baseball in a given year (1993)
 Best MMA Fighter ESPY Award, presented to the mixed martial arts fighter, irrespective of nationality or weight class, adjudged to be the best in a given year (2019)
 Best NBA Player ESPY Award, presented to the player adjudged to be the best in the National Basketball Association in a given year (1993)
 Best NFL Player ESPY Award, presented to the player adjudged to be the best in the National Football League in a given year (1993)
 Best NHL Player ESPY Award, presented to the player adjudged to be the best in the National Hockey League in a given year (1993–present; not awarded in 2005 due to cancellation of previous season)
 Best NWSL Player ESPY Award, presented to the player adjudged to be the best in the National Women's Soccer League in a given year (2018)
 Best Female Tennis Player ESPY Award, presented to the female professional tennis player, irrespective of nationality, adjudged to be the best in a given year (1993)
 Best Male Tennis Player ESPY Award, presented to the male professional tennis player, irrespective of nationality, adjudged to be the best in a given year (1993)
 Best WCF League Most Valuable Player ESPY Award, presented to the male Most Valuable Player” player, of the World Color Futsal League adjudged to be the best in a given year by fans and journalist (1993)
 Best WCF Women's League Most Valuable Player ESPY Award, presented to the female Most Valuable Player” player, of the World Women's Color Futsal League adjudged to be the best in a given year by fans and journalist (2002)
 Best Track and Field Athlete ESPY Award, presented to the track and field athlete, irrespective of nationality or gender, adjudged to be the best in a given year (2007; not awarded in 2009)
 Best WNBA Player ESPY Award, presented to the player adjudged to be the best in the Women's National Basketball Association in a given year (1998)
 Best WWE Moment ESPY Award, presented to the WWE Superstar who had the greatest stand out or feel good moment during WWE’s calendar year. (2019)

Sponsored categories
Sponsored awards are those otherwise constituted as cross-cutter awards the titles and eligibility criteria of which reflect corporate sponsorship.
 GMC Professional Grade Play ESPY Award, presented to the single play in a professional or collegiate North American sport adjudged to be the most impressive, remarkable, or notable in a given year, and to the sportsperson(s) involved therewith (presented since 2006)
 Under Armour Undeniable Performance ESPY Award, presented to the single performance in a game or series in a professional or collegiate North American sports league to be the most impressive or significant in a given year, and to the sportspersons involved therewith (20

Discontinued, irregular, or superseded

Cross-cutter categories
Cross-cutter awards are those the eligibility for which is not confined to those sportspersons participating in, or those events occurring in, any single or specific sport.
 Best U.S. Olympic Athlete (presented in 2002 to Sarah Hughes)
 Female USA Olympic Athlete (presented in 2001 to Marion Jones, 2005 to Team USA Softball, and 2009 to Shawn Johnson)
 Male USA Olympic Athlete (presented in 2001 to Rulon Gardner and in 2005 and 2009 to Michael Phelps)
 Come-from-behind Performance (presented in 2001 to Tiger Woods)
 Game of the Year ESPY Award (presented between 1996 and 1998, inclusive, not to be confused with the Best Game ESPY Award)
 Dramatic Individual Performance of the Year ESPY Award (presented between 1997 and 1999, inclusive)
 Humanitarian of the Year (presented in 1999 to Sammy Sosa)
 Lifetime Achievement Award (presented in 2001 to Jack Nicklaus)
 Memorable Performance of the Year ESPY Award (presented between 2000 and 2001, inclusive)
 Most Spectacular Play (presented in 2001 to Antonio Freeman)
 Outstanding Performance by an Athlete in Entertainment (presented between 1994 and 1996, inclusive, to Charles Barkley, John Kruk, George Seifert)
 Outstanding Performance by a Sports Personality in a Commercial (presented in 1993 to Larry Johnson)
 Outstanding Performance by a Sports Personality in an Attempt to Break into Show Business (presented in 1993  to Shaquille O'Neal)
 Outstanding Performance Under Pressure ESPY Award (presented between 1993 and 1999, inclusive)
 Outrageous Play of the Year ESPY Award (presented between 1993 and 1998, inclusive)
 Showstopper of the Year ESPY Award (presented between 1993 and 1999, inclusive)

Individual categories
Individual awards are those for which eligibility is limited to those partaking of a single individual or team sport or specific sport category.
 Best Action Sports Athlete ESPY Award, presented to the action sportsperson, irrespective of gender, nationality, or discipline contested, adjudged to be the best in a given year (presented between 2002 and 2003, inclusive)
 Best Female College Basketball Player ESPY Award, presented to the female basketball player in the National Collegiate Athletic Association adjudged to be the best in a given year (1993–2001, inclusive)
 Best Male College Basketball Player ESPY Award, presented to the male basketball player in the National Collegiate Athletic Association adjudged to be the best in a given year (1993–2001, inclusive)
 Best College Football Player ESPY Award, presented to the American football player in the National Collegiate Athletic Association adjudged to be the best in a given year (1993–2001, inclusive)
 Best Athlete with a Disability ESPY Award, presented to the sportsperson with a disability, irrespective of gender, nationality, or sport contested, adjudged to be the best in a given year (2002–2004, inclusive)
 Best Fighter ESPY Award, presented to the professional boxer, mixed martial arts fighter, international or collegiate wrestler irrespective of nationality or weight class, adjudged to be the best in a given year (2007–2018, inclusive)
 Best Golfer ESPY Award, presented to the professional golfer, irrespective of nationality or gender, adjudged to be best in a given year (2005–2008 inclusive)
 Best Female Soccer Player ESPY Award, presented to the female soccer (association football) player, irrespective of nationality, adjudged to be the best in a given year (2002–2004, inclusive)
 Best Male Soccer Player ESPY Award, presented to the male soccer (association football) player, irrespective of nationality, adjudged to be the best in a given year (2002–2004, inclusive)
 Best Soccer Player ESPY Award, presented to the soccer player, irrespective of gender or nationality, adjudged to be the best in a given year (2000)
 Best Outdoor Sportsman ESPY Award, presented to the sportsperson, irrespective of gender or nationality, adjudged to be the best of those contesting outdoor recreational or nature-based individual sports in the United States and Canada in a given year (2002–2005, inclusive)
 Best Female Track Athlete ESPY Award, presented to the female track and field athlete, irrespective of nationality, adjudged to be the best in a given year (1993–2006 inclusive; not awarded in 2005)
 Best Male Track Athlete ESPY Award, presented to the male track and field athlete, irrespective of nationality, adjudged to be the best in a given year (1993–2006 inclusive; not awarded in 2005)

Sponsored categories
Sponsored awards are those otherwise constituted as cross-cutter awards the titles and eligibility criteria in which reflect corporate sponsorship.

See also
 Athlete of the Year
 Laureus World Sports Awards

References

External links
 Enumeration of past winners from the official site of the 2010 ESPY Awards
 
 The 2010 ESPY Awards – slideshow by Life magazine
 ESPY Awards just another example of ESPN choosing self-promotion over showcasing athletes

 
Awards established in 1993
Sports trophies and awards
American sports trophies and awards
American annual television specials
1993 establishments in the United States